The Opir River is located in Ukraine, within Stryi Raion of Lviv Oblast. It is a right tributary of the river Stryi (Dniester basin).

Geography 
It runs between the mountains of the Skole Beskids, mainly to the northeast and north. It flows into the Stryi River between the town of Verkhnie Synovydne and the village of Mezhybrody.

The shores are steep and occasionally swampy. The bottom is usually lined with pebbles of Carpathian sandstones. The river supplies water for settlements and for the irrigation of agricultural lands. 

Recently, the river has become popular among tourists who go rafting.

Tributaries 

Settlements 
Several settlements are located on the river (in order from the source to the mouth): , Lavochne, Ternavka, Slavske, Tukhlia, Hrebeniv, Skole, Dubyna, Verkhnie Synovydne.

Gallery

References

External links 

Rivers of Lviv Oblast
Tributaries of the Dniester